François Fédier (19 December 1935 – 28 April 2021) was a French philosopher and translator.

Biography
Fédier was a student of Jean Beaufret in the 1950s and began translating the works of Martin Heidegger in 1958. Some controversies surrounded his translations of Heidegger. He became a teacher at the Lycée Pasteur in Neuilly-sur-Seine until his retirement in 2001.

François Fédier died in Paris on 28 April 2021.

Publications
Interprétations (1985)
Heidegger, Anatomie d'un scandale (1988)
Regarder voir (1995)
Soixante-deux photographies de Martin Heidegger (1999)
L'Art : deux cours, une conférence, une dissertation (2000)
La Raison ; Note sur la norme ; Pour commencer à lire le "Phèdre" de Platon (2001)
Leibniz : deux cours : "Principes de la nature et de la grâce fondés en raison", "Monadologie" (2002)
La Métaphysique, la finalité, le bonheur, le modèle (2003)
Martin Heidegger : le temps, le monde (2005)
L'Art en liberté : Aristote, Baudelaire, Proust, Flaubert, Cézanne, Kant, Matisse, Heidegger (2006)
Voix de l'ami (2007)
Entendre Heidegger et autres exercices d'écoute (2008)
L'Imaginaire (2009)
Le Ménon. Quatre cours, cinquante et une explications de texte (2011)
La Métaphysique : cours de philosophie (2012)
L'Humanisme en question : pour aborder la lecture de la 'Lettre sur l'humanisme' de Martin Heidegger (2012)
Tenir / Entretenir / S'Entretenir (2019)
Lire Heidegger sans délirer (Pour une éthique de l'interprétation) (2019)

References

1935 births
2021 deaths
French philosophers
French translators
Writers from Paris